Dzmitry Vyarstak (born 29 August 1980) is a retired Belarusian professional football player.

External links
 Profile at teams.by
 

1980 births
Living people
Belarusian footballers
Association football forwards
Belarusian expatriate footballers
Expatriate footballers in Poland
FC Smorgon players
FC Neman Grodno players
FC Belcard Grodno players
FC Torpedo Minsk players
FC SKVICH Minsk players
Elana Toruń players